Ranadhir Reddy is an Indian actor working in Telugu cinema. He made his debut as an actor with Shekar Kammula's much acclaimed film Happy Days in 2007.

Early life
Reddy was born and brought up in Hyderabad. He pursued his M.B.A from Symbiosis Institute of Management Studies and later lived in Bangalore while working at Microsoft. Before entering the film industry, Reddy worked as a model and appeared in few television advertisements.

Career
In 2007, Reddy attended an audition for a Sekhar Kammula's film, although he had no previous acting experience. The film which portrays the mindset of a typical engineering student made youth to connect with the characters involved. It was a high critical and commercial success, winning several accolades, including six Filmfare Awards South and three Nandi Awards. Reddy played a haughty character and his performance was received well. Then, offers came his way. He was then seen in Mr. Medhavi directed by the national award winning director, G. Neelakanta Reddy. This film’s cast included prominent actors like Genelia D'Souza and Sonu Sood.

Reddy later acted in Yuvatha – a youth oriented mass entertainer alongside Nikhil Siddharth who was also a lead in Happy Days and that is where he started working on his drawbacks. Reddy received credits for his acting in the film Baanam for his negative role as a local don, slowly building his empire, terrorizing police. Critics expressed their warm admiration as he pretty much resembled the acting of J.D Chakravarthy. In 2011, Pilla Zamindar happened in which he played as something he never did before. Later in 2013, he had another release "Break up"- a suspense and romantic entertainer which bombed at the box office yet received positive critical response. This is because of his tremendous will power and dedication to learn. Everytime he challenged himself, worked hard on it and came out with flying colours.

He has been working on several projects simultaneously, including Aadu Magaadra Bujji and Adda, under huge production houses. He did a great job in a pivotal role for the movie Poga. Ramudu manchi baludu comes out with a different shade of him. He also played a key role in the film Dhanalakshmi Talupu Thadithe.

In 2015, Reddy did six films. He received compliments for his outstanding performance in Subramanyam for Sale, a romantic commercial stuff where his role has different shades to work on.

Filmography

References

Male actors from Hyderabad, India
Telugu male actors
Indian male film actors
21st-century Indian male actors